Hanhofen is a municipality in the Rhein-Pfalz-Kreis, in Rhineland-Palatinate, Germany.

Sister-city
 Kondoros, Hungary since 23 May 1998

Literature

References

Rhein-Pfalz-Kreis